"Lying Time Again" is a song written by Chance Walker, and recorded by American country music artist Mel Tillis. It was released in January 1980 as the second single from his 1979 album Me and Pepper. The song reached No. 6 on the Billboard Hot Country Singles & Tracks chart.

Chart performance

References

1979 songs
1980 singles
Mel Tillis songs
Song recordings produced by Jimmy Bowen
Elektra Records singles